Jharli is a village in Matanhail tahsil of Jhajjar district in the Indian state of Haryana. It has gained popularity after the set up of a thermal power plant, Indira Gandhi Super Thermal Power Project by NTPC Limited. It is developing as an industrial town with two power plants and three cement factories. Before it was used for industrial purposes, it served as agricultural land for nearby villagers.

Landmarks 
There are no nearby places to visit due to industries nearby but some places are in radius of 60 km.
 Tilyar Lake, Rohtak
 Rohtak Zoo, Rohtak
 Rose Garden, Charkhi Dadri

Location 
Jharli is situated in Jhajjar, Haryana, India. Its geographical coordinates are 28° 31' 0" North, 76° 23' 0" East. Its original name (with diacritics) is Jhārli.

Climate 
The climate in Jharli is referred to as a local steppe climate. During the year there is little rainfall. The average temperature in Jharli is 25.2 °C. The rainfall averages 476 mm. The temperatures are highest on average in June, at around 34.2 °C. January is the coldest month, with temperatures averaging 14.3 °C.

Transport

Road 
Jharli is connected to these cities via road network:
 Delhi - 100 km
 Jaipur - 260 km
 Rohtak - 50 km

Railways 
Jharli is connected to these cities via railways network:
 Hisar
 Rewari
 Sirsa
 Bhiwani
 New Delhi

Education 
Jharli has some educational institutes nearby, including:
 Bal Bharati Public School, NTPC Township
 RED, Chhuchhakwas
 GD Goenka, Chhuchhakwas
 Petals Nursery School, NTPC Township
 H.D.Sr.Sec.School, Salhawas

References 

Villages in Jhajjar district